The 7.5 cm Flak. L/60 was a German anti-aircraft gun built during the 1930s and used by Germany in limited numbers during the Second World War.  Although not produced in great numbers its features were further developed in the 8.8 cm Flak 18/36/37/41 series of guns.

History
After the defeat of the Central Powers in World War I Germany faced a prohibition on new weapons development imposed by the Versailles treaty.  However, Krupp sidestepped these restrictions by opening foreign subsidiaries or by entering into joint-development agreements with companies such as Bofors to develop a new anti-aircraft gun.  The development of the gun was secretly funded by the Reichswehr and in 1925 Krupp acquired a controlling interest in Bofors and a team of German experts was sent to Sweden.

The resulting gun the Bofors 75 mm Model 1929 proved adequate for the Swedes, but trials of 7.5 cm Flak. L/60 proved unsatisfactory and the Germans requested a heavier design.  The 75 mm was then modified to include a larger caliber barrel, which was further developed into the 8.8 cm Flak 18/36/37/41, one of the best-known AA guns of World War II.

Despite German unwillingness to buy the 75 mm variant, Bofors decided to start serial production anyway and the Bofors 75 mm Model 1929 proved an export success.  Krupp also began production of the 7.5 cm Flak. L/60 for foreign customers such as Brazil and Spain.  At the outbreak of war in 1939 undelivered guns were seized and assigned to the Kriegsmarine who employed them as coastal artillery and anti-aircraft guns.

Notes

Bibliography

External links

75 mm artillery
World War II anti-aircraft guns
Bofors
Krupp